The Seeburg Castle University was established by the Austrian Accreditation Council under the name to Private University of Economics' as a private university on 22 November 2007.  It is headquartered in Schloss Seeburg in Seekirchen am Wallersee.  In February 2008, the name was changed to Seeburg Castle University.

Educational Concept 
The Seeburg Castle University is pursuing the concept of a semi-virtual studies.  Core of this concept is to combine an Internet-based program with the contact and deepening possibilities of presence studies.  Students come here three times per semester for one week in the university to attend courses, take exams and to talk to the students, professors and university coaches.

Scholarships 
In cooperation with business partners, the Seeburg Castle University promotes particularly committed students.  The corresponding scholarships ranging from training to over power to research grants.

Accreditation status 
Under Austrian law, private universities have to be re-accredited on a regular basis.

External links 
 Seeburg Castle University

References 

Universities and colleges in Austria
Private universities and colleges in Austria